The Battle of Burs was a minor engagement in 636 AD at Burs or Birs Nimrud, now in central Iraq, during the Muslim conquest of the Sassanid Empire. The Rāshidūn commander, Zuhra ibn al-Ḥawiyya, defeated Busbuhra, the Sassanid commander of the town, in single combat, and the garrison offered little further resistance.

After his victory at the Battle of al-Qādisiyyah in summer 636, Saʿd ibn Abī Waqqās divided his army into five forces for the advance on Ctesiphon; they were commanded by Zuhra ibn al-Ḥawiyya, ʿAbdullah ibn al-Mutʼim, Shurḥabīl ibn as-Simt, Khālid ibn ʿUrfatah and Hāshim bin ʿUtba. The force under Zuhra met with some resistance at Burs, but this was soon overcome after he defeated Busbuhra, the garrison commander, in single combat.

References 

Burs
Ctesiphon
Burs
Muslim conquest of Mesopotamia
636